The Point Pleasant Micropolitan Statistical Area, as defined by the United States Census Bureau, is an area consisting of two counties – one in West Virginia and one in Ohio – anchored by the city of Point Pleasant, West Virginia.

As of the 2000 census, the Point Pleasant MSA had a population of 57,026 (though a July 1, 2009 estimate placed the population at 56,252).

Counties
Mason County, West Virginia
Gallia County, Ohio

Communities
Places with more than 1,000 inhabitants
Gallipolis, Ohio
Point Pleasant, West Virginia (Principal city)
Mason, West Virginia
New Haven, West Virginia
Places with 500 to 1,000 inhabitants
Hartford City, West Virginia
Rio Grande, Ohio
Places with less than 500 inhabitants
Centerville, Ohio
Cheshire, Ohio
Crown City, Ohio
Henderson, West Virginia
Leon, West Virginia
Vinton, Ohio
Unincorporated places
Apple Grove, West Virginia
Bidwell, Ohio
Gallipolis Ferry, West Virginia
Glenwood, West Virginia
Kerr, Ohio
Letart, West Virginia
Patriot, Ohio
Townships (Gallia County, Ohio)
Addison
Cheshire
Clay
Gallipolis
Green
Greenfield
Guyan
Harrison
Huntington
Morgan
Ohio
Perry
Raccoon
Springfield
Walnut

Demographics
As of the census of 2000, there were 57,026 people, 22,647 households, and 16,155 families residing within the μSA. The racial makeup of the μSA was 96.67% White, 1.70% African American, 0.32% Native American, 0.32% Asian, 0.004% Pacific Islander, 0.13% from other races, and 0.86% from two or more races. Hispanic or Latino of any race were 0.55% of the population.

The median income for a household in the μSA was $28,663, and the median income for a family was $34,446. Males had a median income of $32,083 versus $19,952 for females. The per capita income for the μSA was $14,994.

See also
West Virginia census statistical areas
Ohio census statistical areas

References

 
Mason County, West Virginia
Gallia County, Ohio
Appalachian Ohio